Daniel Wilkinson may refer to:
Dan Wilkinson (born 1973), professional player of American football
Daniel Wilkinson (murderer) (1845–1885), last person to be executed by Maine

See also
Daniel Leech-Wilkinson, musicologist